Atma Ram Padukone (1930–94) was Hindi film and TV director born in Calcutta. He was the younger brother of legendary film maker Guru Dutt.

Personal life 
His father Shivshankar Padukone was a clerk at Burmah Shell and his mother was a teacher. He grew up with his three brothers – Guru Dutt (filmmaker), Devi Dutt (producer) and Vijay (advertising) - and his sister Lalitha Lajmi.

He studied at the University of Bombay (1952).

After doing some clerical work he joined the Socialist Party (1948–50).He was an active trade unionist and secretary of the Press Workers’ Union. He worked for a while in London (1958–61) directing films produced by Stuart Legg and Arthur Elton for the Shell Film Unit; also scripted documentaries for James Beveridge for India’s Shell Film Unit (1955–62).

Filmography 
Umang was his first independent Atma Ram Films production,with the then unknown Subhash Ghai as actor. His Yeh Gulistan Hamara, for Guru Dutt Films, is a nationalist movie in which Dev Anand, on behalf of the Indian government, quells the North Eastern frontier tribals with love.

The Saira Banu and Vinod Khanna hit Aarop addressed corruption in journalism. He also made advertising films with his younger brother, Devi Dutt.

1993 Vividha (TV Series)

1992 Tulsidas

1990 Beesvah Unth (TV Series)

1988 J.P. (Documentary)

1988 Yeh Such Hai (Documentary)

1982 Pyaar Ke Rahi

1980 Khanjar

1978 Ramlal Shyamlal (TV Series)

1977 Aafat

1977 Ashanti Shantidas (TV Series)

1976 Ladoosingh Taxiwala (TV Series)

1975 Qaid

1974 Resham Ki Dori

1974 Aarop

1972 Yaar Mera

1972 Yeh Gulistan Hamara

1971 Memsaab

1970 Umang

1969 Chanda Aur Bijli

1968 Shikar

1964 Kaise Kahoon

1961 The Peaceful Revolution (Documentary)

1960 The Living Soil (Short documentary)

References 

Hindi-language film directors
1994 deaths
Indian television directors
1930 births